Jo-Wilfried Tsonga was the defending champion, but turned professional during this season.

Gaël Monfils would have been the first junior to achieve a calendar Grand Slam since Stefan Edberg in 1983 but lost in the third round to Viktor Troicki.

Andy Murray won the title by defeating Sergiy Stakhovsky 6–4, 6–2 in the final. It was the 1st and only Grand Slam title in his Juniors career. Murray would go on to win the senior title in his maiden Grand Slam title eight years later.

Seeds

Draw

Finals

Top half

Section 1

Section 2

Bottom half

Section 3

Section 4

References

External links
 Official Results Archive (ITF)
 Unofficial Results Archive

Boys' Singles
US Open, 2004 Boys' Singles